St. Francis Assisi is a catholic church in Tallur, originally established in 1934. It was renovated during Fr. Sunil Veigas's service into a star-shaped temple and inaugurated in May 2016.

History 
Before 1929 there were no prayer centers for Christians and so the devotees from and around Tallur throng into Holy rosary Catholic Church. Later Rev Fr. Peter Remegias D’Souza in 1928 purchased a land in Tallur and simultaneously constructed a small hut. There was a plea from the devotees to set up separate church at Tallur. After this demand was approved in the parish level meeting, the church was established in 1934, and got its first ever priest in the form of Fr Edward Lobo.

Architect 
The foundation stone for the proposed new building was laid on 20 October 2012. ‘Shilpi’ architects based in Kerala designed this church building. Sandeep Almeida from the town began to serve as engineer. From outside this building looks like a star. The church has entrance from three sides through similar doors. The windows have been placed in such a way that they allow abundant light and air to enter into the building. The three-side doors to the building provide the experience of entering a star. The whole church now has single fan. The building has 143 feet wide and 113 feet high with a total area of 10,800 square feet. A spacious altar has been erected. For anyone who comes near the Church, it looks like a star that has been placed vertically. The concept of fixing a single fan is under consideration. Glass is used in 40 percent of the building. Modern monitor tiles have been used. Glass is being used for outer walls too to the extent of 40 percent. Flooring is provided through attractive granite slabs.

Inauguration 
The church was inaugurated by Gerald Isaac Lobo Bishop of Udupi Diocese on 12 May 2016. He had also offered the first Eucharistic service in the new church. An honoring function was held after the holy mass. Vinay Kumar Sorake Minister for Urban Development and District minister in-charge,  Fr Anil D’Souza, Dean Kundapur Deaneryand others attended as chief guests for the function.

Association 
Catholic Sabha, St Vincent De Paul organization, Franciscan organization, Young Christian Students Association, Altar Boys Association with 18 committees.

References 

Roman Catholic churches in Karnataka